The 1988 Bristol Open was a tennis tournament played on grass courts that was part of the 1988 Nabisco Grand Prix. It was played at Bristol in Great Britain from 13 June to 20 June 1988.

Finals

Singles

 Christian Saceanu defeated  Ramesh Krishnan 6–4, 2–6, 6–2
 It was Saceanu's only title of the year and the 1st of his career.

Doubles

 Peter Doohan /  Laurie Warder defeated  Martin Davis /  Tim Pawsat 2–6, 6–4, 7–5
 It was Doohan's only title of the year and the 5th of his career. It was Warder's 2nd title of the year and the 5th of his career.

References

External links
 ITF tournament edition details